Gamma is a small neotropical, primarily northern Andean genus of potter wasps currently containing 6 recognized species.

References

 Giordani Soika, A. 1990. Revisione degli Eumenidi neotropicali appartenenti ai generi Pachymenes Sauss., Santamenes n. gen., Brachymenes G. S., Pseudacaromenes G. S., Stenosigma G. S. e Gamma Zav. (Hymenoptera). Boll. Mus. Civ. Stor. Nat. Venezia 39: 71–172.
 Cooper, M. 1999b. New species of Gamma Zavattari (Hym., Vespidae, Eumeninae). Entomol. Mon. Mag. 135: 183–186.

Potter wasps
Hymenoptera genera
Taxa described in 1912